Shahrak-e Shohada may refer to:
 Shahrak-e Shohada, Fars
 Shahrak-e Shohada, Khuzestan